Cross My Heart is a Canadian drama film, directed by Luc Picard and released in 2017.

Set in 1970, the film centres on Manon (Milya Corbeil-Gauvreau), a young girl who is staying with her aunt and uncle (Jean-François Boudreau and Julie Ménard) as her father is dying of cancer and her mother is struggling with depression. Scared that she may be taken by children's aid and separated from her younger brother Mimi (Anthony Bouchard), she takes inspiration from the contemporaneous October crisis and kidnaps elderly neighbour Rose (Clare Coulter) so that she, Mimi and their cousins Martin (Henri Richer-Picard) and Denis (Alexis Guay) can safely travel to an isolated rural cabin where Manon hopes to live free of parental interference.

The film was written by Nicole Bélanger, as an adaptation of her novel Salut mon roi mongol!.

The film was selected at the prestigious Berlin International Film Festival in 2018.

Plot
During the October Crisis, when the Front de libération du Québec kidnap Canada's British ambassador James Cross and then the Quebec cabinet minister Pierre Laporte, Manon is a young girl in an impoverished Montreal family. Her father is suffering from cancer, and while her mother is suffering a nervous breakdown, she takes over the bulk of responsibility in caring for her younger brother, Mimi. The two children spend most of their time at the house of their aunt and uncle Simone and Gaston, with their cousins Martin and Denis. Observing the FLQ Manifesto read on the news, Manon is unable to understand if the FLQ are good or bad, and the conservative Gaston argues with his revolutionary son, Paul. Feeling neglected, Manon writes her own "manifesto" on children's rights. Manon and Mimi overhear they will be placed in a foster home. Seeking to avert this, Manon decides, based on the news, that taking a hostage is the way to get what one wants. She and Martin plot kidnapping an elderly woman, Mrs. Robinson, and write a ransom letter threatening to execute her unless demands are met, signing it the "Family Cell". Manon decides to omit mention of the foster home until their second "communique". They convince Mimi of the appeal of the plan by telling him he will finally have a "grandmother". Martin and Manon appear at Mrs. Robinson's house in Halloween costumes, and successfully seize and drug her. Manon, Martin, Denis and Mimi then take her to an unused cabin in Saint-Zénon, Quebec.

With the four children missing, the police are contacted. Paul soon emerges as the suspect in kidnapping the four children when the police find he has a collection of revolutionary literature, including White Niggers of America. Neither the family nor police know where Paul is. At Saint-Zénon, when Mrs. Robinson wakes up, the children realize she only speaks English, and the French-speaking children can only communicate with her in a very limited way. When Mrs. Robinson begins to have heart issues, Manon and Martin also realize she requires medication and is running low on pills. They visit a pharmacy, but the pharmacist is unwilling to fill a Montreal subscription.

The children are able to communicate to Mrs. Robinson that they want a grandmother, and Mrs. Robinson is willing to read to Mimi and Denis and bake them a cake. However, the pharmacist sees a newspaper article about the four missing children, and recognizing Manon and Martin, alert the police. The police head to Saint-Zénon to arrest Paul, but do not find him there. They take the children into custody, while Mrs. Robinson, having a heart attack, is taken out on an ambulance. Paul is located in prison, arrested after the federal government invoked the War Measures Act.

Manon and Mimi's father dies and Mrs. Robinson attends the funeral. Mimi is then transferred to a foster home, while Manon is placed in a centre for juvenile delinquents. When a social worker accidentally leaves Mimi's new address and the centre's keys in front of Manon, Manon uses them to escape and travel to the foster home. She picks up Mimi in the night, promising to take him to Disneyland, and the two siblings set out on foot.

Accolades
The film received six Canadian Screen Award nominations at the 6th Canadian Screen Awards in 2018.

References

External links
 

2017 films
2010s drama road movies
Films directed by Luc Picard
Films based on Canadian novels
Canadian drama road movies
2017 drama films
French-language Canadian films
2010s Canadian films